Han Byung-Yong (born November 27, 1983) is a South Korean footballer. He is currently a free agent. He was on the books at K-League side Suwon Samsung Bluewings, for whom he made 14 first team appearances.

References

External links 
 

1983 births
Living people
South Korean footballers
Suwon Samsung Bluewings players
Daejeon Korail FC players
K League 1 players
Korea National League players
Association football midfielders